Cnephasia orthias is a species of moth of the family Tortricidae. It is found in Australia.

References

orthias
Moths of Australia
Moths described in 1910
Taxa named by Edward Meyrick